Cane toads may refer to:

Cane toad
Cane toads in Australia
Cane Toads: An Unnatural History film 
a nickname for the Queensland rugby league team